Kolonia Potok Wielki is a village in the administrative district of Gmina Potok Wielki, within Janów Lubelski County, Lublin Voivodeship, in eastern Poland.

The village has a population of 500.

References

Kolonia Potok Wielki